Proprioseiopsis basis is a species of mite in the family Phytoseiidae.

References

basis
Articles created by Qbugbot
Animals described in 1994